The women's omnium competition at the 2018 UEC European Track Championships was held on 6 August 2018.

Results

Scratch race
The scratch race was started at 14:25.

Tempo race
The tempo race was started at 16:10.

Elimination race
The tempo race was started at 19:01.

Points race
The points race was started at 20:06.

Final ranking
The final ranking is given by the sum of the points obtained in the 4 specialties.

References

Women's omnium
European Track Championships – Women's omnium